Michał Gołaś (born 29 April 1984) is a Polish former professional road bicycle racer, who rode professionally between 2007 and 2021 for five different professional teams. Specialising as a domestique, Gołaś took two victories during his professional career – the 2012 Polish National Road Race Championships, and the 2015 Kampioenschap van Vlaanderen.
 
He now works as a directeur sportif for UCI WorldTeam .

Personal life
Gołaś is married, and has three children.

Major results
Source: 

2002
 2nd Overall Driedaagse van Axel
2005
 3rd Gran Premio Industrie del Marmo
 10th Gran Premio della Liberazione
2006
 1st  Road race, National Under-23 Road Championships
 7th Overall Giro delle Regioni
 7th Gran Premio Industrie del Marmo
 7th Coppa della Pace
 8th Trofeo Zsšdi
 9th Coppa Città di Asti
2009
 4th Overall Tour of Małopolska
 7th Overall Giro di Sardegna
 7th Tour de Rijke
2010
 1st  Sprints classification, Tour of Britain
 3rd Ronde van Drenthe
 6th Clásica de Almería
2011
 1st  Mountains classification, Tour de Pologne
 4th Road race, National Road Championships
 4th Overall Tour de Wallonie
 5th London–Surrey Cycle Classic
 9th Clásica de Almería
2012
 1st  Road race, National Road Championships
 8th Overall Tour of Turkey
 Giro d'Italia
Held  after Stages 12–14
2013
 4th Overall Ster ZLM Toer
 9th Overall Tour of Britain
2014
 1st  Mountains classification, Tour of Beijing
 2nd Classic Sud-Ardèche
 3rd Grand Prix Impanis-Van Petegem
 5th Road race, National Road Championships
2015
 1st Kampioenschap van Vlaanderen
 2nd Road race, National Road Championships
2016
 1st Stage 1 (TTT) Vuelta a España
2018
 4th Road race, National Road Championships
2020
 1st  Mountains classification, Tour de Wallonie

Grand Tour general classification results timeline

References

External links 

1984 births
Living people
Sportspeople from Toruń
Polish male cyclists
Cyclists at the 2012 Summer Olympics
Cyclists at the 2016 Summer Olympics
Olympic cyclists of Poland